Myriopteris gracillima, formerly known as Cheilanthes gracillima, is a species of lip fern known by the common name lace lip fern. It is native to western North America, where it grows in rocky habitat from British Columbia to California to Montana.

Description

Myriopteris gracillima has dark green leaves up to about 25 cm (10 in) long that arise from a short creeping ground stem (rhizome), such that plants often have an elongated base, for example creeping along a rock crevice. Each frond is intricately divided into segments made up of pairs of smaller segments which are oval in shape and beadlike, with their edges rolled under, giving it a somewhat succulent appearance. They are also quite hairy and scaly, mostly on the underside of the leaf and leaf mid-rib. The sori are located within rolled-under margins (false indusium) of each tiny leaf segment. It usually grows in sun in crevices in rock formations or sometimes in thin soil in and around rocks. 

More technical description adapted from Burke Herbarium:  Myriopteris gracillima is a lithophytic perennial, with leaves emerging from short creeping stems that are 4-8 mm in diameter with narrow scales that are uniformly brown or with a weakly defined dark central stripe; the scales are straight to somewhat contorted, loosely appressed, and persistent. Leaves are 5-25 cm long and 1-2.5 cm wide and are born on a dark brown petiole. The leaf blade is linear-oblong and 2-3-pinnate at base. The rachis is rounded on the upper surface, with dispersed linear scales. Pinnae are not articulate, and the dark stalk color continues into the pinna base. Pinnae are usually equilateral, appearing slightly pubescent or glabrous on upper surface, with pinna midribs green on upper surface for the majority of length. Scales on the underside of the rachis are arranged in several rows, linear and truncate at base, inconspicuous, 0.1-0.4 mm wide at most, loosely imbricate, not hiding the ultimate segments, and long-ciliate with cilia typically confined to the base. The ultimate pinna segments are oblong or rarely ovate and beadlike, 1.5-3 mm at most. The leaf lower surface is densely covered with branched hairs and small ciliate scales. The leaf upper surface has dispersed and branched hairs, which tend to be shed as the leaf ages.

Range
M. gracillima is native to mountains in western North America, ranging from British Columbia to California. It is absent in lower elevation dry inland areas such as the shrub-steppe of central Washington and Oregon and the central valley of California, but is present in the Rocky Mountains in British Columbia, Idaho, western Montana, and Nevada. It is also found at low elevation in the Columbia River gorge only in the region where it transects the Cascade Mountain range, presumably because of higher precipitation.

Habitat
M. gracillima grows primarily in sunny exposures in rock crevices with little or no soil.

Ecology
Like many cheilanthoid ferns, M. gracillima tolerates desiccation well. During an extended dry period leaves curl and expose their hairy abaxial (lower) surface, presumably to reduce water loss. The leaves uncurl and green up when moisture returns.

Taxonomy
Myriopteris gracillima (maternal) and Myriopteris covillei (paternal) are the parents of the allotetraploid fertile hybrid Myriopteris intertexta.

Gallery

References

Works cited

External links
Jepson Manual eFlora (TJM2) treatment of Myriopteris gracillima
USDA Plants Profile
Flora of North America
Botany Photo of the Day
Photo gallery

gracillima
Ferns of California
Flora of the West Coast of the United States
Flora of British Columbia
Flora of Montana
Natural history of the California Coast Ranges